Achirus zebrinus is a species of sole in the family Achiridae. It was described by Howard Walton Clark in 1936. It is found in the southeastern Pacific.

References

Pleuronectiformes
Fish described in 1936